Plum Coulee is an unincorporated urban community in the Municipality of Rhineland within the Canadian province of Manitoba that held town status prior to January 1, 2015. It is west of Altona, one hour southwest of Winnipeg and 22 kilometres from the United States border. It is also the former home to the Plum Coulee Xpress hockey club. It has an artificial beach located in town called Sunset Beach.

Demographics 

Notable persons
 Philanthropist Saidye Bronfman was born in Plum Coulee.
 Food writer Cecily Brownstone was born in Plum Coulee.
 Violinist Rosemary Siemens is from the Plum Coulee area.

Climate 
Plum Coulee has the hottest daytime temperatures in Manitoba. Summers are hot and winters are similar to other cities in the Canadian Prairies. There are 21 inches of precipitation annually.

Neighbouring communities

References

External links 
Former Town of Plum Coulee

Designated places in Manitoba
Former towns in Manitoba
Pembina Valley Region
Populated places disestablished in 2015